Thomas Toohey (January 1, 1835 – November 19, 1918) served in the Union Army during the American Civil War. He received the Medal of Honor.

Toohey was born on January 1, 1835, in New York City. He joined the 24th Wisconsin Infantry from Milwaukee, Wisconsin in August 1862, and mustered out in June 1865.  He died on November 19, 1918, and was buried at Mount Washington Cemetery in Independence, Missouri.

Medal of Honor citation
His award citation reads:

For gallantry in action on 30 November 1864, while serving with Company F, 24th Wisconsin Infantry, in action at Franklin, Tennessee. Sergeant Toohey voluntarily assisting in working guns of battery near right of the regiment after nearly every man had left them, the fire of the enemy being hotter at this than at any other point on the line.

See also

List of Medal of Honor recipients
List of American Civil War Medal of Honor recipients: T–Z

References

1835 births
1918 deaths
Military personnel from Milwaukee
Military personnel from New York City
Union Army soldiers
United States Army Medal of Honor recipients
American Civil War recipients of the Medal of Honor